Kongsberg Digital AS is a company in the Kongsberg Group. It was established in 2016, to provide software and digital solutions such as artificial intelligence, maritime simulation and automation to companies within the merchant navy, the petroleum industry and renewable energy and utilities industry, and to gather the information technology competence from its parent company in one place. The first appr. 450 employees at Kongsberg Digital came from other business areas within the Kongsberg Group.

Kongsberg Digital has created a digital platform which has gained much attention and become the company's most popular product.
Among other things, the company is working on further developing its digital platform, an open ecosystem and digital twins.

References 

2016 establishments in Norway
Digital
Computer companies of Norway